Abu Simbel is a historic site comprising two massive rock-cut temples in the village of Abu Simbel, Aswan Governorate, Upper Egypt, near the border with Sudan. The twin temples were originally carved out of the mountainside in the 13th century BC, during the 19th Dynasty reign of the Pharaoh Ramesses II. Their huge external rock relief figures of Ramesses II have become iconic. His wife, Nefertari, and children can be seen in smaller figures by his feet. Sculptures inside the Great Temple commemorate Ramesses II's heroic leadership at the Battle of Kadesh.

The complex was relocated in its entirety in 1968 to higher ground to avoid it being submerged by Lake Nasser, the Aswan Dam reservoir. As part of International Campaign to Save the Monuments of Nubia, an artificial hill was made from a domed structure to house the Abu Simbel Temples, under the supervision of a Polish archaeologist, Kazimierz Michałowski, from the Polish Centre of Mediterranean Archaeology University of Warsaw.

The Abu Simbel complex, and other relocated temples from Nubian sites such as Philae, Amada, Wadi es-Sebua, are part of the UNESCO World Heritage Site known as the "Nubian Monuments".

History

Construction 
During his reign, Ramesses II embarked on an extensive building program throughout Egypt and Nubia, which Egypt controlled. Nubia was very important to the Egyptians because it was a source of gold and many other precious trade goods. He, therefore, built several grand temples there in order to impress upon the Nubians Egypt's might and Egyptianize the people of Nubia. The most prominent temples are the rock-cut temples near the modern village of Abu Simbel, at the Second Nile Cataract, the border between Lower Nubia and Upper Nubia. There are two temples, the Great Temple, dedicated to Ramesses II himself, and the Small Temple, dedicated to his chief wife Queen Nefertari.

Construction of the temple complex started in approximately 1264 BC and lasted for about 20 years, until 1244 BC. It was known as the "Temple of Ramesses, beloved by Amun".

Rediscovery 

With the passage of time, the temples fell into disuse and the Great Temple eventually became mostly covered by a sand dune. By the 6th century BC, the sand already covered the statues of the main temple up to their knees. The temple was forgotten until March 1813, when Swiss researcher Johann Ludwig Burckhardt found the small temple and top frieze of the main temple. 
When we reached the top of the mountain, I left my guide, with the camels, and descended an almost perpendicular cleft, choaked with sand, to view the temple of Ebsambal, of which I had heard many magnificent descriptions. There is no road at present to this temple... It stands about twenty feet above the surface of the water, entirely cut out of the almost perpendicular rocky side of the mountain, and in complete preservation. In front of the entrance are six erect colossal figures, representing juvenile persons, three on each side, placed in narrow recesses, and looking towards the river; they are all of the same size, stand with one foot before the other, and are accompanied by smaller figures... Having, as I supposed, seen all the antiquities of Ebsambal, I was about to ascend the sandy side of the mountain by the same way I had descended; when having luckily turned more to the southward, I fell in with what is yet visible of four immense colossal statues cut out of the rock, at a distance of about two hundred yards from the temple; they stand in a deep recess, excavated in the mountain; but it is greatly to be regretted, that they are now almost entirely buried beneath the sands, which are blown down here in torrents. The entire head, and part of the breast and arms of one of the statues are yet above the surface; of the one next to it scarcely any part is visible, the head being broken off, and the body covered with sand to above the shoulders; of the other two, the bonnets only appear. It is difficult to determine, whether these statues are in a sitting or standing posture; their backs adhere to a portion of rock, which projects from the main body, and which may represent a part of a chair, or may be merely a column for support.

Burckhardt talked about his discovery with Italian explorer Giovanni Belzoni, who travelled to the site, but was unable to dig out an entry to the temple. Belzoni returned in 1817, this time succeeding in his attempt to enter the complex. A detailed early description of the temples, together with contemporaneous line drawings, can be found in Edward William Lane's Description of Egypt (1825–1828).

Relocation 

In 1959, an international donations campaign to save the monuments of Nubia began: the southernmost relics of this ancient civilization were under threat from the rising waters of the Nile that were about to result from the construction of the Aswan High Dam.

One scheme to save the temples was based on an idea by William MacQuitty to build a clear freshwater dam around the temples, with the water inside kept at the same height as the Nile. There were to be underwater viewing chambers. In 1962 the idea was made into a proposal by architects Jane Drew and Maxwell Fry and civil engineer Ove Arup. They considered that raising the temples ignored the effect of erosion of the sandstone by desert winds. However, the proposal, though acknowledged to be extremely elegant, was rejected.

The salvage of the Abu Simbel temples began in 1964 by a multinational team of archeologists, engineers and skilled heavy equipment operators working together under the UNESCO banner; it cost some US$40 million at the time (equal to $300 million in 2017 dollars). Between 1964 and 1968, the entire site was carefully cut into large blocks (up to 30 tons, averaging 20 tons), dismantled, lifted and reassembled in a new location 65 metres higher and 200 metres back from the river, in one of the greatest challenges of archaeological engineering in history. Some structures were even saved from under the waters of Lake Nasser. Today, a few hundred tourists visit the temples daily. Most visitors arrive by road from Aswan, the nearest city. Others arrive by plane at an airfield that was specially constructed for the temple complex. 

The complex consists of two temples. The larger one is dedicated to Ra-Horakhty, Ptah and Amun, Egypt's three state deities of the time, and features four large statues of Ramesses II in the facade. The smaller temple is dedicated to the goddess Hathor, personified by Nefertari, Ramesses's most beloved of his many wives.
The temple is now open to the public.

Great Temple 
The Great Temple at Abu Simbel, which took about twenty years to build, was completed around year 24 of the reign of Ramesses the Great (which corresponds to 1265 BC). It was dedicated to the gods Amun, Ra-Horakhty, and Ptah, as well as to the deified Ramesses himself. It is generally considered the grandest and most beautiful of the temples commissioned during the reign of Ramesses II, and one of the most beautiful in Egypt.

Entrance
The single entrance is flanked by four colossal,  statues, each representing Ramesses II seated on a throne and wearing the double crown of Upper and Lower Egypt. The statue to the immediate left of the entrance was damaged in an earthquake, causing the head and torso to fall away; these fallen pieces were not restored to the statue during the relocation but placed at the statue's feet in the positions originally found.
Next to Ramesses's legs are a number of other, smaller statues, none higher than the knees of the pharaoh, depicting: his chief wife, Nefertari Meritmut; his queen mother Mut-Tuy; his first two sons, Amun-her-khepeshef and Ramesses B; and his first six daughters: Bintanath, Baketmut, Nefertari, Meritamen, Nebettawy and Isetnofret.

It carries a frieze depicting twenty-two baboons worshipping the rising sun with upraised arms and a stele recording the marriage of Ramesses to a daughter of king Ḫattušili III, which sealed the peace between Egypt and the Hittites. 

The entrance doorway itself is surmounted by bas-relief images of the king worshipping the falcon-headed Ra Horakhty, whose statue stands in a large niche. Ra holds the hieroglyph user and a feather in his right hand, with Maat (the goddess of truth and justice) in his left; this is a cryptogram for Ramesses II's throne name, User-Maat-Re.

Interior
The inner part of the temple has the same triangular layout that most ancient Egyptian temples follow, with rooms decreasing in size from the entrance to the sanctuary. The temple is complex in structure and quite unusual because of its many side chambers. The colossal statues along the left-hand wall bear the white crown of Upper Egypt, while those on the opposite side are wearing the double crown of Upper and Lower Egypt (pschent). The bas-reliefs on the walls of the pronaos depict battle scenes in the military campaigns that Ramesses waged. Much of the sculpture is given to the Battle of Kadesh, on the Orontes river in present-day Syria, in which the Egyptian king fought against the Hittites. The most famous relief shows the king on his chariot shooting arrows against his fleeing enemies, who are being taken prisoner. Other scenes show Egyptian victories in Libya and Nubia.

From the hypostyle hall, one enters the second pillared hall, which has four pillars decorated with beautiful scenes of offerings to the gods. There are depictions of Ramesses and Nefertari with the sacred boats of Amun and Ra-Horakhty. This hall gives access to a transverse vestibule, in the middle of which is the entrance to the sanctuary. Here, on a black wall, are rock cut sculptures of four seated figures: Ra-Horakhty, the deified king Ramesses, and the gods Amun Ra and Ptah. Ra-Horakhty, Amun Ra and Ptah were the main divinities in that period and their cult centers were at Heliopolis, Thebes and Memphis respectively.

Solar alignment 
It is believed that the axis of the temple was positioned by the ancient Egyptian architects in such a way that on October 22 and February 22, the rays of the sun would penetrate the sanctuary and illuminate the sculptures on the back wall, except for the statue of Ptah, a god connected with the realm of the dead, who always remained in the dark. People gather at Abu Simbel on these days to witness this.

These dates are allegedly the king's birthday and coronation day, respectively. There is no direct evidence to support this. It is logical to assume, however, that these dates had some relation to a significant event. In fact, according to calculations made on the basis of the heliacal rising of the star Sirius (Sothis) and inscriptions found by archaeologists, this date must have been October 22. This image of the king was enhanced and revitalized by the energy of the solar star, and the deified Ramesses the Great could take his place next to Amun-Ra and Ra-Horakhty.

Because of the accumulated drift of the Tropic of Cancer due to Earth's axial precession over the past 3 millennia, the event's date must have been different when the temple was built. This is compounded by the fact that the temple was relocated from its original setting, so the current alignment may not be as precise as the original one.

Greek graffito 
A graffito inscribed in Greek on the left leg of the colossal seated statue of Ramesses II, on the south side of the entrance to the temple records that:

 Kerkis was located near the Fifth Cataract of the Nile "which stood well within the Cushite Kingdom."

Historic photographs

Small Temple 

This was in fact the second time in ancient Egyptian history that a temple was dedicated to a queen. The first time, Akhenaten dedicated a temple to his great royal wife, Nefertiti. The rock-cut facade is decorated with two groups of colossi that are separated by the large gateway. On either side of the portal are two statues of the king, wearing the white crown of Upper Egypt (south colossus) and the double crown (north colossus); these are flanked by statues of the queen.

Remarkably, this is one of very few instances in Egyptian art where the statues of the king and his consort have equal size. Traditionally, the statues of the queens stood next to those of the pharaoh, but were never taller than his knees. Ramesses went to Abu Simbel with his wife in the 24th year of his reign. As the Great Temple of the king, there are small statues of princes and princesses next to their parents. In this case they are positioned symmetrically: on the south side (at left as one faces the gateway) are, from left to right, princes Meryatum and Meryre, princesses Meritamen and Henuttawy, and princes Pareherwenemef and Amun-her-khepeshef, while on the north side the same figures are in reverse order. The plan of the Small Temple is a simplified version of that of the Great Temple.

As in the larger temple dedicated to the king, the hypostyle hall in the smaller temple is supported by six pillars; in this case, however, they are not Osiris pillars depicting the king, but are decorated with scenes with the queen playing the sistrum (an instrument sacred to the goddess Hathor), together with the gods Horus, Khnum, Khonsu, and Thoth, and the goddesses Hathor, Isis, Maat, Mut of Asher, Satis and Taweret; in one scene Ramesses is presenting flowers or burning incense. The capitals of the pillars bear the face of the goddess Hathor; this type of column is known as Hathoric. The bas-reliefs in the pillared hall illustrate the deification of the king, the destruction of his enemies in the north and south (in these scenes the king is accompanied by his wife), and the queen making offerings to the goddesses Hathor and Mut. The hypostyle hall is followed by a vestibule, access to which is given by three large doors. On the south and the north walls of this chamber there are two graceful and poetic bas-reliefs of the king and his consort presenting papyrus plants to Hathor, who is depicted as a cow on a boat sailing in a thicket of papyri. On the west wall, Ramesses II and Nefertari are depicted making offerings to the god Horus and the divinities of the Cataracts—Satis, Anubis and Khnum.

The rock-cut sanctuary and the two side chambers are connected to the transverse vestibule and are aligned with the axis of the temple. The bas-reliefs on the side walls of the small sanctuary represent scenes of offerings to various gods made either by the pharaoh or the queen. On the back wall, which lies to the west along the axis of the temple, there is a niche in which Hathor, as a divine cow, seems to be coming out of the mountain: the goddess is depicted as the Mistress of the temple dedicated to her and to queen Nefertari, who is intimately linked to the goddess.

Historic photographs

Climate 
Köppen-Geiger climate classification system classifies its climate as hot desert (BWh).

Gallery

See also 
List of ancient Egyptian sites, including sites of temples
List of archaeoastronomical sites sorted by country
List of colossal sculptures in situ

References

Further reading 
 - Highly detailed article describing the process of saving and creating a new location for the temples.

External links 

Abu Simbel at the website of Egypt State Information Service

 
13th-century BC establishments in Egypt
1813 archaeological discoveries
Archaeological sites in Egypt
Buildings and structures completed in the 13th century BC
Colossal statues in Egypt
Egyptian temples
Lake Nasser
Monuments and memorials in Egypt
Nefertari
Nineteenth Dynasty of Egypt
Open-air museums in Egypt
Ramesses II
Relocated ancient Egyptian monuments
Rock reliefs in Egypt
Stone buildings
Tourist attractions in Egypt
World Heritage Sites in Egypt
International Campaign to Save the Monuments of Nubia
Rock-cut architecture
Ra
Amun
Ptah
Hathor